The Western Association of Physicians (WAP) is a regional health association of academic physician-scientists. It was founded in 1955 by Robert Williams, the Chair of the Department of Medicine at the University of Washington, and other eminent physicians with the aim of establishing a western society analogous to the Association of American Physicians. Along with Williams, the founders of the WAP were Maxwell Wintrobe, Theodore Althausen, Joseph Ross, Clement Finch, David A. Rytand, John Lawrence, and Gordon Meiklejohn.

Over the years the society has grown to a membership of several hundred, including many distinguished academicians from diverse areas of medicine.

Officers

President: Wes Van Voorhis, Division Head, Allergy & ID, Department of Medicine, Univ of WA
President-Elect: Joshua Goldhaber, Cedars Sinai Heart Institute
Secretary-Treasurer: Mary Malloy, UCSF
Councilor: E. Dale Able, Univ. of Utah
Councilor: Gregory Brent, Endocrinology and Diabetes Division, VA Greater Los Angeles Healthcare System
Councilor: Ravi Durvasula, University of New Mexico, School of Medicine
Councilor: Jeffrey Glenn, Stanford School of Medicine Digestive Disease Center
Ex Officio: David Gilbert, Providence Medical Center, Portland
Past-President: Carlin Long, Denver Health Medical Center

Annual Meeting
The Western Association of Physicians meets annually in Carmel, California, to discuss and present research and other educational programs. Through 2016, the event was called the Western Regional Meeting; starting in 2017, it became the Western Medical Research Conference (WMRC), in partnership with other regional medical societies. The conference is held in late January.

References

External links
  Western Association of Physicians, official website.

Medical associations based in the United States
Organizations established in 1955
Medical and health organizations based in Washington (state)
1955 establishments in Washington (state)